Stand is Michael W. Smith's twentieth album, a follow-up to his 2004 album Healing Rain.

Track listing

Personnel 
 Michael W. Smith – vocals, acoustic piano
 Patrick Warren – additional keyboards, Chamberlin
 Jeremy Bose – accordion
 Rusty Anderson – guitars
 Bruce Gaitsch – guitars
 Paul Moak – guitars, additional instrumentation 
 James Gregory – bass
 Lindsay Jamieson – drums
 Luis Conte – percussion 
 David Davidson – violin
 Demarco Johnson – harmonica
 Jonathan Rathbone – string arrangements for Gettysburg Music
 Joni McCabe – string conductor and producer 
 The Philharmonic Orchestra at The CSNO Studio (Prague, Czech Republic) – strings

Choir
 Bethany Ballinger, Sampson Brueher, Lani Crump, Christina Deloach, Rebecca Kohl, J.T. Landry, Gabrielle Lehr, Michael Olson, Anna Smith, Emily Smith, and Whitney Smith

Production 
 Matt Bronleewe – producer
 Michael W. Smith – executive producer
 Rusty Varenkamp – engineer, editing
 Roberto Bosquez – assistant engineer
 Colin Heldt – assistant engineer
 Brien Sager – assistant engineer
 Josh Bronleewe – additional editing (11)
 Dark Horse Recording Studio (Franklin, Tennessee) – recording location
 Track Record (North Hollywood, California) – additional recording
 Pentavarit (Nashville, Tennessee) – additional recording
 Blue 42 (Franklin, Tennessee) – additional recording
 Deer Valley Studios (Franklin, Tennessee) – additional recording
 Shane D. Wilson – mixing
 Kip Kubin – mix assistant
 Dave Steunebrink – mix coordination and production coordination for Showdown Productions
 Alice Smith – mix coordination for Showdown Productions
 Lani Crump – production coordination for Showdown Productions
 George Marino – mastering at Sterling Sound (New York City, New York)
 Michelle Pearson – A&R production
 Stephanie McBrayer – art direction
 Tim Parker – art direction
 Robert Ascroft – photography
 Natalia Bruschi – hair, make-up
 Eric Niemand – stylist

Chart performance

References

2006 albums
Michael W. Smith albums
Reunion Records albums